The men's pole vault competition of the athletics events at the 2019 Pan American Games took place on the 10 of August at the 2019 Pan American Games Athletics Stadium. The defending Pan American Games champion is Shawnacy Barber from Canada.

Summary
The medals were decided at 5.61m, only three cleared it.  Among the eliminated was Olympic champion Thiago Braz.  Clayton Fritsch couldn't get over 5.71m and Augusto Dutra got over it on his second attempt, while Chris Nilsen still had a perfect round going.  Dutra passed the next height, daring Nilsen to get over it.  Nilsen was well over the bar on his attempts but peaking well behind the bar, he knocked it off on his first two attempts.  On his final attempt at  he was still too close to the bar, but managed to snake over it.  When he landed with the bar still on its pegs, he celebrated.  Both made attempts at 5.81m.  At 1cm below his personal best from 6 years earlier, it would have been a heroic jump for Dutra, though still 14 cm below what Nilsen had done just two months earlier to win the NCAA Championships.  Neither man made it, leaving Dutra with silver while Nilsen took gold.

Records
Prior to this competition, the existing world and Pan American Games records were as follows:

Schedule

Results
All times shown are in meters.

Final
The results were as follows:

References

Athletics at the 2019 Pan American Games
2019